The County of Bogong is one of the 37 counties of Victoria which are part of the cadastral divisions of Australia, used for land titles. It is located south of the Murray River, east of the Ovens River, and west of the Mitta Mitta River. Mount Bogong is located there, the highest mountain in Victoria. The county was proclaimed in 1871.

Origin of the name
Bogong moth is a native insect of Australia. This was once considered a delicacy by the aborigines who collected the dormant larvae and cooked them. A town, Bogong, in the state of Victoria has been named after the moth.

Parishes 
Parishes within the county:
 Barambogie, Victoria
 Baranduda, Victoria
 Barnawartha North, Victoria
 Barnawartha South, Victoria
 Barwidgee, Victoria
 Beechworth, Victoria
 Beethang, Victoria
 Belvoir West, Victoria
 Bingo-Munjie, Victoria
 Bingo-Munjie North, Victoria
 Bingo-Munjie South, Victoria
 Bogong North, Victoria
 Bogong South, Victoria
 Bolga, Victoria
 Bonegilla, Victoria
 Bontherambo, Victoria
 Boorgunyah, Victoria
 Boorhaman, Victoria
 Bright, Victoria
 Brimin, Victoria
 Bruarong, Victoria
 Bundara-Munjie, Victoria
 Byawatha, Victoria
 Carlyle, Victoria
 Carraragarmungee, Victoria
 Carruno, Victoria
 Chiltern, Victoria
 Chiltern West, Victoria
 Darbalang, Victoria
 Dederang, Victoria
 Dorchap, Victoria
 El Dorado, Victoria
 Estcourt, Victoria
 Everton, Victoria
 Freeburgh, Victoria
 Gooramadda, Victoria
 Gundowring, Victoria
 Harrietville, Victoria
 Hotham, Victoria
 Kergunyah, Victoria
 Kergunyah North, Victoria
 Lilliput, Victoria
 Lochiel, Victoria
 Ludrik-Munjie, Victoria
 Magorra, Victoria
 Mudgeegonga, Victoria
 Mullagong, Victoria
 Mullindolingong, Victoria
 Murmungee, Victoria
 Murramurrangbong, Victoria
 Myrtleford, Victoria
 Noorongong, Victoria
 Norong, Victoria
 Nowyeo, Victoria
 Omeo, Victoria
 Porepunkah, Victoria
 Stanley, Victoria
 Tallandoon, Victoria
 Tangambalanga, Victoria
 Tarrawingee, Victoria
 Tawanga, Victoria
 Theddora, Victoria
 Tongaro, Victoria
 Undowah, Victoria
 Wallaby, Victoria
 Wangaratta North, Victoria
 Wermatong, Victoria
 Wodonga, Victoria
 Wollonaby, Victoria
 Woorragee, Victoria
 Woorragee North, Victoria
 Yackandandah, Victoria

References
Vicnames, place name details
Research aids, Victoria 1910

See also
 Counties of Victoria

Counties of Victoria (Australia)